() is a type of tropical home garden developed in Indonesia, mainly in Java.  typically contain plants, while some possess animals (including farmed fish, ruminants, poultry, and wild animals) and structures such as pens and bird cages. The gardens yield food for subsistence and income, and plants for ornamental use. Along with their subsistence and commercial uses, they are used for social interactions and yield sharing and provide materials for cultural ceremonies and religious practices. Some  are made, maintained, and spatially arranged according to local values. Home gardens of this kind may have existed for several thousand years, but their first mention is found in a Javanese chronicle that was written in 860 AD.

The sustainability and social roles of  have been threatened by mass urbanization and land fragmentation, which are the factors of decreasing land dwelling area on average. The decrease is consequently followed by loss of plant diversity within the gardens. Additionally, some owners deliberately reduce the plant diversity to optimize yields for commercial purposes. Problems such as pest outbreaks and a rise in household debts have appeared due to the degraded sustainability of the gardens.

Throughout the history of Java,  have been of little interest to the governments that have ruled the island due to their minimal susceptibility to yield extraction. In the 2010s, they have gained the attention of the Indonesian government implemented through P2KP, a program focused on urban and peri-urban areas that aims to optimize production with a sustainable approach.

Definition 
In Indonesian,  can be translated as "land that surrounds a house", "a house's yard", or "plotted land for house construction". However, the term is widely used in scientific literature, specifically in agroforestry and environmental topics, to mean "home gardens".

Scholars offer various definitions of the term "". According to Sajogyo, it is a plot adjacent to a house, used part-time. Totok Mardikanto and Sri Sutami define it as a plot surrounding a house; most of its kind are fenced, and usually planted with dense plants with various annual and perennial plants for daily and commercial use.  Euis Novitasari considers "" to be a form of land use: a system of small-scale additional food production by members and a family, that is also an ecosystem with a densely layered canopy. Further, she describes it as having a clear boundary and containing elements such as the owner's house, a kitchen, a pen, and fences. Simatupang and Suryana argue that it is hard to define "" clearly, since its role can vary as a form of farmland to a homestead plot.

Elements

Plants 

A  generally consists of annual and perennial plants combined; they can be harvested daily or seasonally. Some other perennials such as coconut, jackfruit, banana, and salak produce fruit all year round. Other perennials' fruiting periods are limited: for example, the  guava (Syzygium aqueum) fruits from April to June, mangoes fruit during July and August, and durians (Durio zibethinus) from June to September. Perennials are more common than annuals in  throughout regions where rice fields account for more than 40 percent of land area; elsewhere the situation is reversed, and annuals are more common, though if labor is in short supply, perennials are again favored.

In Sundanese , ornamental plants, and crops such as cloves, oranges, and mangoes are frequently planted in the front patch, as these are valuable plants that homeowners want to keep an eye on. Starchy crops, medicinal plants, and cash crops are more frequent in the front and back plots, and less in the side plots. Coffee might be used as a hedge in the side and back yards; ornamental plants might have a similar function in front yards. Vegetables are habitually grown in front and side areas to be exposed to light, as tall trees are rare in those areas. Trees with large canopies might be planted in front yards, providing shade for children. Coconuts, fruit trees, and tall trees whose woods are used for construction are planted in back gardens to avoid damage to the house when any of them falls due to a storm. Most plants propagate without intentional human intervention—this natural process is called  in Sundanese—due to seed scattering by birds, mammals, or humans after they eat. Because of this, no clear spatial arrangement is found in Sundanese back gardens.

Plants in Javanese and Sundanese , among them annual plants cultivated in the dry season (e.g. eggplants), are habitually grown near water sources such as fish ponds, open sewage ditches, and wells. Plants that need high levels of nutrients, such as banana, mango, jackfruit, and other fruit plants, are planted close to garbage dumps. Meanwhile, crops frequently harvested for cooking, such as chili peppers, langua, lemongrass, and tomatoes, are planted near the kitchen.

Animals 

Some owners of  keep livestock and poultry (traditionally chickens, goats, and sheep), usually in a household pen. Animals are usually allowed to roam around the gardens, village areas, and traditional markets to find food on their own. They are penned at night and are usually given additional feed. The economic status of  owners plays a role in livestock ownership; lower-class owners tend to own several chickens whereas middle-class owners might have a goat or a sheep, and wealthier owners may own several cows or water buffaloes. Livestock manure acts as an organic fertilizer for the gardens via composting, and sometimes a nutritional source for pond fishes.

Productive fish ponds are common in Sundanese traditional . The fishes are fed with kitchen waste supplemented by animal and human waste. Villagers avoid the domestic use of fish pond water and instead use water from higher-ground water pipes.

The gardens may have a high diversity of soil fauna. According to Widyastuti, the soil fauna diversity in the gardens is suggested to be higher than that of teak forests. The diversity might be caused by the vegetation, which protects soil fauna from direct sunshine, especially in the dry season. Otto Soemarwoto and Gordon Conway accounted that the gardens are also believed to be "a good habitat" for reptiles and amphibians.

There are different findings in relation to wild birds. A high diversity of birds, including legally protected species, within the gardens were recorded in a West Java research while another study in Jambi suggests individual  are not effective as a means to conserve bird communities. This is because of the edge effects of their irregular shapes, their frequent disturbance, and their proximity to roads and houses. The  used for the Jambi study had unusually low levels of plant diversity, which may account for the results. Despite this, the gardens apparently still attract birds due to their food resources. A similar finding was repeated in a separate West Java study, indicating children shoot birds in the gardens and take their eggs while adults kill or chase them due to the perception of them as pests.

Ecology 

Plant diversity in  arises from complex interactions between several factors that are not fully understood. These include environmental stability, the tropical climate that is favorable to plant growth, and their close proximity to the owners' domestic activities. Other natural factors are size, temperature decrease due to elevation, precipitation, and climatic events like El Niño. Anthropological factors include individual preferences and market proximity.

The diversity of plants aids individual plants to adapt to a changing environment, helping them survive in the long term. The biodiversity in the multi-layered system also helps to optimize solar energy and carbon harvesting, cool the domestic climate, protect the soil from erosion, and accommodate habitats for wild plants and animals. The genetic diversity also gives protection from the effects of pests and diseases. As an example, the abundance of insectivorous birds in the gardens helps control pests, helping the garden remain productive.

While on per individual basis  store only small amounts of carbon due to their size, on per area basis they hold an amount of carbon that is similar to primary or secondary forests, and greatly surpassing Imperata grasslands and fallow lands.

Natural factors 
Plant diversity in  tends to increase as their size increases. Diversity of crop species, however, might reach a plateau in very large gardens. Larger  have a lower density of crop species because of more constant cultivation patterns. Meanwhile, similar gardens in other Indonesian islands tend to be larger.

Pekarangans at high altitudes tend to have a smaller size, increased density of plants, and a smaller range of plant diversity. As altitude increases, temperature decreases, limiting plant diversity. Coconuts and fruit trees tend to develop better in lower-altitude pekarangans while vegetables tend to grow better at higher altitudes.

 with better access to water—either by climate or by proximity to water resources—are able to facilitate annual crop cultivation. Those in West Java, when observed, perform better in accommodating plant diversity when the wet season occurs than in the dry season. The climatic conditions of Java enable the consistent growth of annual plants in its , even in parts of East Java where the climate is drier.

Canopy in those gardens functions as a protection from intense raindrops. Most of their plants' heights are less than a meter, slowing down raindrops when they hit the soil. Leaf litter also helps protecting the soil against erosion. The role of plant canopies in consistently producing organic litter is believed to be more important in reducing erosion than its direct speed-reducing effects on raindrops. Nevertheless, gardens are less effective than natural forests in erosion reduction.

Human impact 
Production in the gardens decreases during rice-harvesting season but peaks during the rest of the year. Lower-income villagers benefit from the consistent productivity of starch crops in the gardens, especially in a period of food shortage pre-rice harvest or after a failed rice harvest by drought.

Settlement dynamics affect  in various ways. Expansion of settlements to new lands, caused by population growth, is the cause of the wide presence of food crops in newly made . People who resettled via the Indonesian transmigration program might support plant diversity in the gardens in the places they migrate to. Plant species brought by internal migrants need to adapt well to the local environment.

Commercialization, fragmentation, and urbanization are major hazards to  plant diversity. These change the organic cycles within the gardens, threatening their ecological sustainability. Commercialization requires a systemic change of crop planting. To optimize and produce more crops, a  owner must specialize in its crops, making a small number of crops dominate the garden. Some owners turn them into monoculture gardens. Fragmentation stems from the traditional system of inheritance. Consequences from the reduction of plant diversity include the loss of canopy structures and organic litter, resulting in less protection of the gardens' soil; loss of pest-control agents, increasing the use of pesticides; loss of production stability; loss of nutrients' diversity; and the disappearance of yields-sharing culture. Despite urbanization's negative effect in reducing their plant diversity, it increases that of the ornamental plants.

A case study of home gardens in Napu Valley, Central Sulawesi, shows that the decrease in soil protection is caused by insufficient soil fertility management, regular weeding and waste burning, dumping waste in garbage pits instead of using it for compost, and spread of inorganic waste. The decrease of soil fertility worsens the decrease of crop diversity in the gardens.

Uses

Subsistence 
Products from  have multiple uses; for example, a coconut tree can provide food, oil, fuel, and building materials, and also be used in rituals and ceremonies. The gardens' plants are known for their products' nutritional benefits and diversity. While rice is low in vitamins A and C, products from the gardens offer an abundance of them.  with more perennial crops tend to create more carbohydrates and proteins, and those with more annual plants tend to create more portions of vitamin A.  also act as a source of firewood and building materials.

Lower-income families tend to consume more leafy vegetables than wealthier families, due to their consistent availability and low price. Low-income families also favor bigger use of fuel sources from the gardens.  in villages act as subsistence systems for families rather than an income source. In areas such as Gunung Kidul, food-producing uses of the gardens are more dominant than crop fields due to soil erosion in these regions.

Commercial 

In urban and suburban areas, major fruit production centers, and tourist destination regions,  tend to act as an income generator. Income from the gardens is mostly from perennial crops. Good market access stimulates the cultivation of commercial crops within the gardens. Other factors that influence their economic significance are their area and the demand for a particular crop.

According to a 1991 article, the poor cultivate subsistence plants in their  with an emphasis on fruits and vegetables, while the rich tend to plant more ornamental plants and cash crops with higher economic value. An article from 2006 also concludes that the importance of commercial plants increases with owners' wealth. A study in Sriharjo, Yogyakarta Special Region, concludes that poorer  owners orient toward commercial uses while richer owners orient toward subsistence uses. Past this point, garden use starts to increase.

Other uses 
The  (Sundanese for "front yard"), part of a Sundanese , is used as a children's playground and adults' gathering place. Especially in urban areas,  also function as aesthetic ornaments of a house, mainly the front yard.

Sociology and economy 
 are mainly developed by women. Forms of such gardens in matriarchal tribes and societies, e.g. Minangkabau, Aceh, and communities in the 1960s Central Java, are more developed than in tribes that tend to be patriarchal, e.g. Batak. For the same reason, matriarchal culture around the gardens started to develop, such as the requirement for the permission of a landowner's wife before selling a plot of land they own –this happens in cities like Tegal. A female-led household would orient their use of the gardens toward household needs. In Madura, however, home gardens are described as the domain of men. The men prepare the land prior to home garden use, plant tree crops, and sell the garden's crops, while women plant annual crops.

In a 2004 report, Javanese  are suggested to have higher net income-per-area than rice fields. The same report argued that the cost of the Javanese gardens' production is lower than that of rice fields. People who focus on the gardens' production instead of rice fields may gain better yields than their counterparts. Poor villagers, however, tend not to concentrate efforts toward the gardens; maintenance of the gardens as a sole income source would require the use of high-risk, high-reward crops, more intensive care, and income would be vulnerable to market fluctuations. Maintenance of diverse cash crops is more intense than that of rice fields and the intensity would make the villagers' gardening schedule less adaptable to rice farming activities.

The gardens, however, tend to have a low demand for labor, offering minimal labor opportunities.

Culture 

This can be done by offering its products to their neighbors, for example during events such as births, deaths, weddings, and cultural events like the Javanese new year and the Mawlid (observance of the birthday of Muhammad). Some offer their products to cure diseases or to protect owners from dangers. Their products are also given during daily life, especially in rural areas. A rural  owner usually allows others to enter it for any practical reason: taking dead wood for fuel, pulling water from a well for their own use, or even taking its crops, though permission might be restricted or denied if the owner has only a limited yield for his or her own consumption.

Javanese culture interpreted the gardens as  –"a complete design". Javanese culture, however, takes offense at the gardens' comparison with forests due to the low social value of forest in the culture. Wayang puppet plays depict forests as "places where wild animals and evil spirits reign" and its clearing, which is done only by men who are believed to have spiritual powers, is viewed as a respectable deed.

Associations of plants in Javanese  tend to be more complex than those in Sundanese . In Javanese gardens, owners also tend to cultivate medicinal plants (jamu) while the Sundanese tend to grow vegetables and ornamental plants.

The front yard is called , a space for a garden shed, ornamental plants, fruit trees, a children's playground, benches, and crop-drying. The side yard is used for wood trees, crops, medicinal herbs, a fish pond, well, and a bathroom. The side yard is also a space for cloth-dying. The back yard is used to cultivate vegetable plants, spice plants, an animal pent, and industrial plants.

 in Lampung have their own elements; alongside plants are feet-washing places used before entering into a house's veranda, a rice-storage room, an outdoor kitchenette or kitchen, a firewood-storage place, and livestock barn.

The  area of a Balinese  faces Mount Agung, which is regarded as a sacred place to pray. Plants with flowers and leaves that are regularly picked and used for Balinese Hinduism liturgical purposes are planted in the  area. The  area is planted with regular flowers, fruits, and leaves. The  area is planted with fruits, stems, leaves, and tubers. The Balinese further developed beliefs about what plants should and should not be planted in various parts of their , following the teachings from the Taru Premana manuscript. As an example, nerium and bougainvillea are believed to emit positive auras while planted in the  area of a  while negative auras are believed to appear if they are planted in front of the bale daja, a building specifically placed in the north part of a dwelling.

History and development 

Indonesia as a whole had  of such gardens.

Central Java is considered the  center of origin, according to Oekan Abdoellah et al.; the gardens later spread to East Java in the twelfth century. Soemarwoto and Conway proposed that early forms of  date back to several thousand years ago but the first-known record of them is a Javanese charter from 860. During the Dutch colonial era,  were referred to as erfcultuur. In the eighteenth century, Javanese  had already so influenced West Java that they had partly replaced  (a local form of mixed gardens) there. Since  contain many species, which mature at different times throughout the year, it has been difficult for governments throughout Javanese history to tax them systematically. Such difficulty might have helped the gardens to become more complex over time. Despite that, past governments still tried to tax the gardens.

Effects of economic and population growth in the late 20th century 
Since the 1970s, Indonesia had observed economic growth rooted in the Indonesian government's five-year development plans (Repelita), which were launched in 1969. The economic growth helped increase the numbers of middle-class and upper-class families, resulting in better life and higher demand for quality products, including fruits and vegetables.  in urban, suburban, and main fruit production areas adapted its efforts to increase their products' quality but this resulted in a reduction of biological diversity in the gardens, leading to an increased vulnerability to pests and plant diseases. Some disease outbreaks in commercial  occurred in the 1980s and the 1990s, such as the citrus greening disease that damaged many mandarin orange trees and the spread of the pathogenic fungi Phyllosticta, which affected almost 20% of clove trees in West Java. This vulnerability also affected their owners' economic and social conditions; owners became more susceptible to debt, the sharing culture in traditional commercial  vanished, and the poor enjoyed fewer rights from them.

Government programs 

The Indonesian government launched a campaign in October 1951, namely , which aimed to persuade communities to plant trees in their home gardens and other types of land. There was no incentive given in the campaign. The campaign ended in 1960.

Since the early 2010s, the government, through the Ministry of Agriculture, runs a  development program named  (P2KP, "Acceleration on Food Diversification") that is focused in urban and semi-urban areas. The program applies its agenda to a concept named  (KRPL; "Sustainable Food Houses Region"). P2KP was begun under the Indonesian Presidential Regulation No. 22 Year 2009. There is also an urban women-focused program named  (GPOP; "Women's Movement for Pekarangan Optimization").

In addition to the national programs, some regions of Indonesia have implemented their own  use programs. The government of East Java launched a program called  ("Green House") in 2010. The provincial government later collaborated with the Ministry of Agriculture to improve upon the  program based on KRPL prototypes in Pacitan, making a new program named .

References

Works cited 

 
 
 
 
 
 
 
 
 
 
 
 
 
 
 
 
 
 
 
 
 
 
 
 
 
 
 
 
 
 
 
 
 

Gardening
Agroforestry systems
Indonesian culture
Landscape architecture